Luleman Rural District is a rural district (dehestan) in Kuchesfahan District, Rasht County, Gilan Province, Iran. At the 2006 census, its population was 14,388, in 4,239 families. The rural district has 12 villages.

References 

Rural Districts of Gilan Province
Rasht County